Fred Preble (1893–1953) was an American art director who designed the sets on well over a hundred film productions. He worked for a variety of production companies, including the studios Monogram and PRC.

Selected filmography

 Ship of Wanted Men (1933)
 I Can't Escape (1934)
 The Marriage Bargain (1935)
 His Fighting Blood (1935)
 Shadow of Chinatown (1936)
 Here's Flash Casey (1937)
 Whirlwind Horseman (1938)
 On the Great White Trail (1938)
 The Terror of Tiny Town (1938)
 Hitler – Beast of Berlin (1939)
 Mercy Plane (1939)
 Gun Code (1940)
 The Sagebrush Family Trails West (1940)
 Isle of Destiny (1940)
 Pride of the Bowery (1940)
 That Gang of Mine (1940)
 Law of the Timber (1941)
 The Mad Monster (1942)
 Take My Life (1942)
 Isle of Forgotten Sins (1943)
 Hitler's Madman (1943)
 Shep Comes Home (1948)
 The Dalton Gang (1949)
 Zamba (1949)
 Outlaw Country (1949)
 Red Desert (1949)
 The Girl from San Lorenzo (1950)
 Colorado Ranger (1950)
 The Daltons' Women (1950)
 West of the Brazos (1950)
 Korea Patrol (1951)
 Man from Sonora (1951)
 The Vanishing Outpost (1951)
 The Black Lash (1952)

References

Bibliography
 Pitts, Michael R. Poverty Row Studios, 1929–1940: An Illustrated History of 55 Independent Film Companies, with a Filmography for Each. McFarland & Company, 2005.

External links

1893 births
1953 deaths
American art directors
People from Los Angeles